(22) Kalliope I Linus is an asteroid moon that orbits the large M-type asteroid 22 Kalliope. It was discovered on August 29, 2001, by astronomers Jean-Luc Margot and Michael E. Brown with the Keck telescope, in Hawaii.  Another team also detected the moon with the Canada-France-Hawaii Telescope on September 2, 2001. Both telescopes are on Mauna Kea. It received the provisional designation S/2001 (22) 1, until it was named.  The naming proposal appeared in the discovery paper and was approved by the International Astronomical Union in July 2003. Although the naming proposal referred to the mythological Linus, son of the muse Calliope and the inventor of melody and rhythm, the name was also meant to honor Linus Torvalds, inventor of the Linux operating system kernel, and Linus van Pelt, a character in the Peanuts comic strip.

With an estimated  (17 ± 1 mi) diameter, Linus is very large compared to most asteroid moons, and would be a sizable asteroid by itself. The only known larger moons in the main belt are the smaller components of the double asteroids 617 Patroclus and 90 Antiope.

It has been estimated that Linus' orbit precesses at quite a rapid rate, making one cycle in several years. This is attributed primarily to the non-spherical shape of Kalliope. Linus's brightness has varied appreciably between observations, which may indicate that its shape is elongated.

Linus may have formed out of  impact ejecta from a collision with Kalliope, or a fragment captured after disruption of a parent asteroid (a proto-Kalliope).

References

External links
IAUC 7703: S/2001 (22) 1, announcing Linus' discovery (2001 September 3)
IAUC 8177: Sats of (22); Sats of Jupiter, Saturn, Uranus, announcing Linus' naming (2003 August 8)
 Link to the Linus discovery paper , "A Low-Density M-type Asteroid in the Main Belt"
Kalliope and Linus very well resolved with the 8m VLT
orbit diagram for Linus
Information on Kalliope, Linus' orbit and several images
A different VLT image of Kalliope and Linus
another image of Kalliope and Linus

Asteroid satellites
Discoveries by Michael E. Brown